Larry Jerome Whigham (born June 23, 1972) is a former professional American football player who played safety for nine seasons for the New England Patriots and Chicago Bears.

Whigham attended the University of Louisiana at Monroe and was drafted by the Seattle Seahawks in the 4th round (110th overall) of the 1994 Draft. He was known for his enthusiasm on the field and excelled in special teams play. He made the Pro Bowl twice as a special teams player, once with New England and once with Chicago. 
 
In January 1997 he earned AFC Special Teams Player of the Week in the AFC Championship Game against Jacksonville when he tackled Jaguar punter Bryan Barker on his own four-yard line, which resulted in a touchdown for the Patriots a few plays later.

On September 21, 1997, Whigham picked up 2 sacks against Rick Mirer and the Chicago Bears.

While Whigham gained attention playing mostly special teams (he started only six games), he intercepted four passes during his career, three of which were against the NFL's all-time leading passer, Dan Marino. He intercepted two Marino passes versus Miami on November 23, 1997, including one he returned 60 yards for a touchdown, and finished the game with a season-high four tackles to earn Player of the Game honors.

He is married to Kenyatta Whigham and now resides in Houston, Texas.

References

1972 births
Living people
Sportspeople from Hattiesburg, Mississippi
American football cornerbacks
New England Patriots players
Chicago Bears players
American Conference Pro Bowl players
National Conference Pro Bowl players
Louisiana–Monroe Warhawks football players
Pearl River Wildcats football players